USCGC Galveston Island (WPB 1349) is an  used by the United States Coast Guard for law enforcement and search and rescue duties. She was commissioned on 5 June 1992 and was the last of the Island-class patrol boats built.  Her original homeport was Apra Harbor, Guam, but later changed to Honolulu, Hawaii, where she was decommissioned.

The 110-foot Island-class patrol boat is a Coast Guard modification of the British shipbuilder, Vosper Thornycroft patrol boat design. With range and seakeeping capabilities, the Island class, all named after U.S. islands, replaced the older 95-foot s.  These cutters are equipped with advanced electronics and navigation equipment.

Design
The Island-class patrol boats were constructed in Bollinger Shipyards, Lockport, Louisiana. It is powered two Paxman Valenta 16 CM diesel engines or two Caterpillar 3516 diesel engines. It has two  3304T diesel generators made by Caterpillar; these can serve as motor–generators. Its hull is constructed from highly strong steel, and the superstructure and major deck are constructed from aluminium.

It is fitted with one  machine gun and two  M60 light machine guns; it may also be fitted with two Browning .50 Caliber Machine Guns. It is fitted with satellite navigation systems, collision avoidance systems, surface radar, and a Loran C system. Its complement is sixteen (two officers and fourteen crew members). Island-class patrol boats are based on Vosper Thornycroft  patrol boats and have similar dimensions.

History
Galveston Island was decommissioned in Honolulu on 16 March 2018 and it is anticipated that she will be transferred to a foreign government via the Foreign Assistance Act.

Notes

Citations

References cited
 
 
 
 
 

Island-class patrol boats
Patrol vessels of the United States
Ships of the United States Coast Guard
1992 ships
Ships built in Lockport, Louisiana